Cambridge was launched in 1825 at Prince Edward Island, Canada. In 1826 she transferred her registry to Bristol, Gloucestershire, England. In 1827 she transported convicts to New South Wales, Australia. She foundered in 1835.

Career
Her owners registered her at Bristol on 13 May 1826, as №61. Her master for much of her career was Richard Pearse, (or Pearce, or Pierce).

On 2 June 1827 Pearse and Cambridge left Dublin for New South Wales. They arrived there on 17  September. She embarked 200 male prisoners and two died en route; she disembarked 198. The 39th Regiment of Foot provided the guard. At the time, the 39th was transferring to Australia and Cambridge carried Colonel Patrick Lindesay as a passenger, as well as his headquarters and the regimental band, which became the second band in the colony. Cambridge left for Batavia and Singapore in early October.

By 1835 Cambridges master was C. Gardner.

Loss
Cambridge departed from Bristol, Gloucestershire, bound for Quebec City, Canada, on 22 April 1835. There was no further trace of her; she was presumed to have foundered with the loss of all hands.

Citations and references
Citations

References
 
 

1825 ships
Ships built in Canada
Age of Sail merchant ships
Merchant ships of the United Kingdom
Maritime incidents in April 1835
Convict ships to New South Wales
Ships lost with all hands
Missing ships